Fotografix is a free and open-source photo editing application for Microsoft Windows. It has been noted for being light on system resources while still providing features found in larger software.

History
Fotografix was initially released as a raster graphics editor in 2009, followed by a series of updates through 2010 leading up to version 1.5. Fotografix 2 was announced in 2012 and a preview version was made available later that year. In November 2021, a new version was announced that shifted its focus to photo editing and dropped general-purpose image editing features from previous versions.

Features
Fotografix is a non-destructive photo editor that does not modify the original photo directly but instead keeps track of adjustments separately. It features basic adjustments such as exposure, contrast, highlights and shadows as well as HSL for selective color adjustments.

See also
 Comparison of raster graphics editors
 Image editing

References

External links
 

Photo software
Windows-only free software
2009 software